Metropolitan may refer to:
 Metropolitan area, a region consisting of a densely populated urban core and its less-populated surrounding territories
 Metropolitan borough, a form of local government district in England
 Metropolitan county, a type of county-level administrative division of England
 Metropolitan Corporation (Pakistan), a local government authority in Pakistan

Businesses
 Metro-Cammell, previously the Metropolitan Cammell Carriage and Wagon Company
 Metropolitan-Vickers, a British heavy electrical engineering company
 Metropolitan Stores, a Canadian former department store chain
 Metropolitan Books, an imprint of Henry Holt and Company

Colleges and universities
 Leeds Metropolitan University, United Kingdom
 London Metropolitan University, United Kingdom
 Manchester Metropolitan University, United Kingdom
 Metropolitan Community College (Omaha), United States
 Metropolitan State University of Denver, United States
 Metro State Roadrunners
 Metropolitan State University, in Saint Paul, Minnesota
 Oslo Metropolitan University, Norway
 Swansea Metropolitan University, United Kingdom
 Tokyo Metropolitan University, Japan
 Toronto Metropolitan University, Canada

Film
 Metropolitan (1990 film), a film by Whit Stillman
 Metropolitan (1935 film), a film by Richard Boleslawski

Literature
 Metropolitan (novel), a science fiction novel by Walter Jon Williams
 The Metropolitan (newspaper), the college newspaper of Metropolitan State University of Denver
The Metropolitan Magazine, a publication from London
 Metropolitan Magazine (New York City), a literary magazine
 Seattle Metropolitan, a local-interest magazine published in Seattle, Washington

Music
 Metropolitan (band), an indie rock group from Washington, D.C.
 "Metropolitan", a song by Nemo

Transport

Transit systems
 Metropolitan (train), a discontinued German train service between Cologne and Hamburg
 Metropolitan line, a London Underground route

Vehicles
 Convair Metropolitan, an airliner
 Metropolitan Special, a named train of the Baltimore and Ohio Railroad, from Jersey City to St. Louis
 Nash Metropolitan, an automobile
 Scania Metropolitan, a double-decker bus
 Metropolitan, a named train of the Pennsylvania Railroad, from New York City to St. Louis

Venues
 Metropolitan (bar), a gay bar in New York City
 Metropolitan Museum of Art, in New York
 Metropolitan Opera, in New York
 Teatro Metropólitan, a theatre in Mexico
 The Metropolitan Theatre, a theatre and music hall in Edgware Road, Paddington, London, now demolished

Other uses 
 Metropolitan (cocktail), a variation of the Brandy Manhattan
 Metropolitan archdiocese, the jurisdiction of a metropolitan archbishop
 Metropolitan area network, a city-spanning computer network
 Metropolitan bishop or archbishop, leader of an ecclesiastical "mother see"
 Metropolitan Division, a division in the National Hockey League
 Metropolitan Police Service, the police force of Greater London, England

See also
 Met (disambiguation)
 Metro (disambiguation)
 Metropol (disambiguation)
 Metropole, "mother country", or central part of a colonizing state
 Metropolis, a large city or conurbation
 Metropolis (disambiguation)
 The Metropolitan (disambiguation)
 Metropolitan Bank (disambiguation)
 Metropolitan France, the part of France in Europe
 Metropolitan Magazine (disambiguation)
 Metropolitan Opera House (disambiguation)
 Moscow Metro (rus. Московский метрополитен), a rapid transit system in Moscow, Russia
 Paris Métro, a rapid transit system in Paris, France
 Rapid transit system, in an urban area
 Transmetropolitan, a comic book series